SelaQui International School is a coeducational, residential school located in the village of SelaQui in the Dehradun district of Uttarakhand. It is about 20 km from Dehradun on national highway 72, connecting Dehradun with Paonta Sahib and Chandigarh. The school is affiliated with the Central Board of Secondary Education (CBSE) and is open to boys and girls from class V onward irrespective of religion, caste, and ethnicity. All students who live on campus are attached to four of the boarding houses named after elements of the earth and supervised by housemasters and matrons. The school is managed by the Gurukul trust, Which appoints a board of governors headed by a chairman to oversee the school's functioning. The present chairman is Om Pathak, an ex-Indian Administrative Service officer.

History
Founded in October 2000 as the first IB School in north India, (previously SelaQui World School), now known as SelaQui International School. The school started as an IB school but switched to a national curriculum (CBSE) in 2013. The school is managed by Gurukul Trust, a non-profit charitable organization based in Delhi.

Infrastructure
The campus is located next to the Suvarna river. It is a fully residential School, with around 350 students.

Alumni
The school alumni are referred to as SeQuin and notable among them are
Gaurav Pandey and Saurabh Pandey.

External links 
SelaQui International School website
SelaQui International School on Wikimapia
 https://www.educationworld.in/selaqui-international-school-dehradun-2/
 https://www.educationworld.in/selaqui-international-school-dehradun-3/
 https://in.pinterest.com/selaqui0301/
 https://www.educationworld.in/covid19-education-warrior-rashid-sharfuddin-selaqui-international-school/
 https://thedailyguardian.com/needed-enquiry-based-learning-with-strong-rd-rashid-sharfuddin/
 https://www.euttaranchal.com/schools/selaqui-international-school-dehradun
 http://bweducation.businessworld.in/tags/Rashid-Sharfuddin-80602/
 Best CBSE Boarding school in Varanasi
 BSI official website

References 

Co-educational boarding schools
Private schools in Uttarakhand
International Baccalaureate schools in India
International schools in India
High schools and secondary schools in Uttarakhand
Boarding schools in Uttarakhand
Schools in Dehradun
Educational institutions established in 2000
2000 establishments in Uttarakhand